The savanna vine snake (Thelotornis capensis) is a species of venomous snake in the family Colubridae.

Geographic range
Thelotornis capensis is found in southern Africa.

Description
Thelotornis capensis is slender and has a long tail.

Reproduction
Thelotornis capensis is oviparous.

Subspecies
There are three subspecies of T. capensis which are recognized as being valid, including the nominotypical subspecies.
Thelotornis capensis capensis 
Thelotornis capensis oatesi 
Thelotornis capensis schilsi 

Nota bene: A trinomial authority in parentheses indicates that the subspecies was originally described in a genus other than Thelotornis.

Etymology
The subspecific name, oatesi, is in honor of British naturalist Frank Oates.

References

Further reading
Access Professional Development. 2022. Vine Snake (Thelotornis capensis capensis). [Online] Available: https://accesspd.co.za/species/vine-snake (Accessed: 02/02/2022)

External links

Colubrids
Reptiles described in 1849
Reptiles of Africa
Venomous snakes